Bosnia and Herzegovina, like many countries is made of geographical and historical and political regions. The current geopolitical regions were finalised with the signing of the Dayton Agreement.

Geographical regions
Bosnia (Bosna)
Bosanska Krajina / Western Bosnia
Bosanska Posavina (Bosnian Sava river basin)
Semberija
Podrinje / Eastern Bosnia (Bosnian Drina river basin)
Srednja Bosna / Central Bosnia
Tropolje

Herzegovina (Hercegovina)
West Herzegovina
East Herzegovina

Historical regions

Bosnia
 Birač
 
 Vrhbosna
 Osat
 Bosanska Krajina
 
 Knešpolje
 Lijevče
 Donji Kraji
 Tropolje
 Herzegovina
 Travunija

Medieval counties
 Dabar
 Drina
 Popovo
 Soli
 Usora
 Vrhbosna
 Vrm
 , (Parish)

Urban regions
Sarajevo
Goražde
Visoko
Banjaluka
Prijedor
Bihać
Mostar
Trebinje
Livno
Tuzla
Brčko
Bijeljina
Zenica
Doboj
Travnik

Political regions

Federation of Bosnia and Herzegovina (FBiH)
Republika Srpska (RS)

See also

List of cities in Bosnia and Herzegovina
Municipalities of Bosnia and Herzegovina
Political divisions of Bosnia and Herzegovina

References